The Montreux Jazz Festival (formerly Festival de Jazz Montreux and Festival International de Jazz Montreux) is a music festival in Switzerland, held annually in early July in Montreux on the Lake Geneva shoreline. It is the second-largest annual jazz festival in the world after Canada's Montreal International Jazz Festival.

History
The Montreux Jazz Festival opened on 18 June 1967 and was founded by Claude Nobs, Géo Voumard and René Langel with considerable help from Ahmet and Nesuhi Ertegun of Atlantic Records. The festival was first held at Montreux Casino. The driving force is the tourism office under the direction of Raymond Jaussi. It lasted for three days and featured almost exclusively jazz artists. The highlights of this era were Charles Lloyd, Miles Davis, Keith Jarrett, Jack DeJohnette, Bill Evans, Soft Machine, Weather Report, The Fourth Way, Nina Simone, Jan Garbarek, and Ella Fitzgerald.

Originally a pure jazz festival, it opened up in the 1970s and today presents artists of nearly every imaginable music style. Jazz remains an important part of the festival. Part of the festival's expansion was due to coproduction by Quincy Jones, who brought many international artists in the early 1990s. Today's festival lasts about two weeks and attracts an audience of more than 200,000 people.

In the 1970s, the festival began broadening its scope, including blues, soul, and rock artists; for instance, Led Zeppelin, Pink Floyd, Frank Zappa, Deep Purple, Canned Heat and many others. Towards the end of the decade, the festival expanded even more, including music from all continents (with an emphasis on Brazilian music) and lasting a full three weeks. Santana came to Montreux for the first time in 1970; Van Morrison played in 1974 and 1980. Other artists included B.B. King, Stevie Ray Vaughan, Gary Moore, Weather Report, Don Ellis, Crossfire, Buddy Guy, Camarón de la Isla and Tomatito, Soft Machine, Chuck Berry, Peter Tosh, George Clinton and Parliament-Funkadelic, Eric Clapton, Luther Allison, Bo Diddley, Stan Getz, Airto Moreira, Joe Henderson, Dizzy Gillespie, Oscar Peterson, Ney Matogrosso, Charles Mingus, Etta James, Sonny Rollins, Son House, Count Basie, Chick Corea, Herbie Hancock, Gilberto Gil, Ray Charles, James Booker, Hermeto Pascoal, Mahavishnu Orchestra, Rory Gallagher, Marianne Faithfull, Elis Regina, Les McCann, Eddie Harris, Pasadena Roof Orchestra, New Order, Jaco Pastorius, Ringo Starr & His All-Starr Band, Toto, Zucchero Fornaciari, André Geraissati, Korni Grupa, Jan Akkerman, Joe Satriani, Status Quo, Prince, and many more.

Initiator and head organizer Claude Nobs brought an array of artists to Montreux. Mathieu Jaton has organised the festival since Nobs' death in 2013.

Venue
The festival was originally held at the original Montreux Casino, which burned down in December 1971 during Frank Zappa's performance (as referenced in "Smoke on the Water" by Deep Purple).
The festival was held then in other auditoriums in Montreux, until it could return to the rebuilt new Casino in 1975. The festival continued to grow, and in 1993, it moved to the larger Montreux Convention Centre. From 1995 through 2008, it occupied both the convention centre and the casino. (This is exacerbated by the presence of a large number of streetside vendors and artisans – as well as strolling crowds of tourists – on the lakefront walk that connects the venues.) As of 2007, the Convention Centre hosts two main stages, Auditorium Stravinski (capacity 3,500) and Miles Davis Hall (capacity 1,800), as well as the smaller Montreux Jazz Cafe, and several smaller open-air stages around the Centre. Additional themed shows (Bahia, Blues, etc.) are held on boats cruising the lake and train cars traveling the region, and various workshops and competitions are held at the nearby Montreux Palais and Le Petit Palais.

Venue history

Expansion 

The festival changed in the 1980s: it grew dramatically and included an even wider variety of music styles. Jazz remained important, as did Brazilian music, but more rock and pop artists were also invited.

Miles Davis came to Montreux several times, British hard rock band Deep Purple were invited as headliners eight times, and Status Quo have headlined the festival twice. Other notable artists at Montreux were Sandra, Max Roach, James Brown, George Clinton and Parliament-Funkadelic, Wynton Marsalis, Art Blakey, John McLaughlin, Stevie Ray Vaughan, Wayne Shorter, Al Di Meola, Elvis Costello, Jimmy Cliff, Steel Pulse, Mike Oldfield, Brian May, Marvin Gaye, Rory Gallagher, Leonard Cohen, Nina Hagen, Eric Clapton, Queen, Phil Collins, Joe Cocker, Los Lobos, The Manhattan Transfer, Tracy Chapman, and Van Morrison again.

The expansion that began in the 1980s has continued since then – Montreux transformed from a jazz festival into a world music festival. Quincy Jones co-produced the festival from 1991 to 1993. By 1993, the festival had outgrown the Casino and moved to the larger Convention Centre. The number of visitors rose from 75,000 in 1980 to 120,000 in 1994, and an "Off-festival" developed on the lakeshore promenades and in the cafés of Montreux.

Many "regulars" returned, but many new artists also appeared on stage: Sting, Bob Dylan, Fats Domino, Deep Purple, Al Jarreau, Chaka Khan, Johnny Cash, Cheap Trick, Cheb Mami, Youssou N'Dour, Marianne Faithfull, Ice-T, Jazzmatazz, ZZ Top, Simply Red, Marisa Monte, George Benson, Jazzkantine, Alanis Morissette, David Bowie, Paul Simon. In 1999, the festival saw more than 220,000 visitors.

The festival has also played host to some well-known and talented student groups, including big bands and vocal ensembles. Young, talented musicians are encouraged to take part in several competitions.

Competitions
Three international competitions are organised by the Montreux Jazz Artists Foundation every year: Solo Piano, Guitar, and Voice. Each competition has its own jury composed of professionals and chaired by a world-renowned musician (in 2008: Fazıl Say for the Piano Solo, Lee Ritenour for the Guitar, Patti Austin for the Voice competition). In addition, until 2016, a local competition, the Tremplin Lémanique, was aimed at jazz bands that are based in one of the regions of the Léman lake: the French departments of Ain and Haute Savoie and the Swiss cantons of Geneva, Vaud and Valais.

Performances

Over 1300 artists have performed at the Festival from 1967 to 2016, with the most appearances by Herbie Hancock (27 times) and B.B. King (21 times).

Discography 

Albums recorded at the festival
 Alanis Morissette: Live at Montreux 2012 (Eagle Rock Entertainment, 2013)[CD/DVD/Blu-ray] – recorded in 2012
 Alice Cooper: Live at Montreux (Eagle Vision, 2006) [CD/DVD] – recorded in 2005
 Arista All Stars: Blue Montreux (Arista, 1979) – recorded in 1978
 Atlantic Family: The Atlantic Family Live at Montreux (Atlantic, 1978) – recorded in 1977
 Baby Consuelo: Baby Consuelo ao Vivo – 14th Montreux Jazz Festival (Elektra, 1980)
 Benny Carter: Benny Carter 4: Montreux '77 (Pablo Live, 1977)
 Bill Evans: Bill Evans at the Montreux Jazz Festival (Verve, 1968)
 Bill Evans: Montreux II (CTI, 1970)
 Bill Evans: Montreux III (Fantasy, 1975)
 Bob James: Live at Montreux (Koch, 2005)[DVD]
 Bobbi Humphrey: Bobbi Humphrey Live: Cookin' with Blue Note at Montreux (Blue Note, 1974) – recorded in 1973
 Bobby Hutcherson: Bobby Hutcherson Live at Montreux (Blue Note, 1974) – recorded in 1973
 Burning Spear: Live at Montreaux Jazz Festival 2001 (Reggae, 2002) – recorded in 2001
 Canned Heat: Live at Montreux 1973 (Eagle, 2012) – recorded in 1973
 Carlos Santana and Wayne Shorter: Live at the Montreux Jazz Festival 1988 (Image Entertainment, 2005)[2CD+DVD]
 Carmen McRae: Everything Happens To Me (Jazz Hour, 1994) – reissued as Live at Montreux 1982 (Solid, 2018)
 Cecil Taylor: Silent Tongues (Freedom, 1975) – recorded in 1974
 Charles Earland: Kharma (Prestige, 1974)
 Charles Lloyd Quartet: Montreux 82 (Elektra/Musician, 1983) – recorded in 1982
 Chick Corea: Live in Montreux (GRP, 1994) – recorded in 1981
 Count Basie: Fun Time (Pablo, 1975)
 Count Basie: Count Basie Jam Session at the Montreux Jazz Festival 1975 (Pablo, 1975)
 Count Basie: Montreux '77 (Pablo, 1977)
 Deep Purple: Live at Montreux 1996 (Eagle, 2006)
 Deep Purple: Live at Montreux 2006 (Eagle, 2007) – recorded in 2006
 Deep Purple: Live at Montreux 2011 (Eagle, 2011)
 Dennis Brown: Live at Montreux (Atlantic, 1979)
 Dexter Gordon and Junior Mance: Dexter Gordon with Junior Mance at Montreux (Prestige, 1970)
 Dexter Gordon: Blues à la Suisse (Prestige, 1973)
 Don Ellis: Don Ellis Live at Montreux (Atlantic, 1978) – recorded in 1977 
 Don Pullen & the African-Brazilian Connection: Live...Again: Live at Montreux (Blue Note, 1993)
 Earl Hines: West Side Story (Black Lion, 1974)
 Ella Fitzgerald: Montreux '77 (Pablo, 1977)
 Ella Fitzgerald: Digital III at Montreux (Pablo, 1979)
 Elis Regina with Hermeto Pascoal: Montreux Jazz Festival 1979 (WEA, 1982)
 Etta James: Live at Montreux 1975-1993 (Ear Music, 2020)
 Gary Moore & The Midnight Blues Band: Gary Moore & The Midnight Blues Band – Live at Montreux 1990 (Eagle Rock Entertainment, 2004)[DVD]
 Gary Moore: Gary Moore – The Definitive Montreux Collection (Eagle Rock Entertainment, 2007)
 Gene Ammons: Gene Ammons and Friends at Montreux (Prestige, 1973)
 Gil Evans: Montreux Jazz Festival '74 (Philips [Japan], 1975)
 Hermeto Pascoal: Ao Vivo Montreux Jazz (Atlantic, 1979)[2LP]
 Rory Gallagher: Live in Montreux (Eagle, 2006)
 Dizzy Gillespie: The Dizzy Gillespie Big 7 (Pablo, 1975)
 Dizzy Gillespie: Dizzy Gillespie Jam (Pablo, 1977)
 Dizzy Gillespie: Musician, Composer, Raconteur (Pablo, 1981)
 Hampton Hawes: Playin' in the Yard (Prestige, 1973)
 James Booker: Live at Montreux (Montreux Sounds, 1997)
 Jamiroquai: Jamiroquai – Live at Montreux 2003 (Eagle Vision, 2007)[DVD/Blu-ray]
 Jethro Tull: Live at Montreux 2003 (2003)[2CD, DVD]
 João Gilberto: Live in Montreux (Elektra/Musician, 1987) – recorded in 1985
 Joe Pass: Montreux '77 – Live (Pablo, 1977)
 Junko Onishi: Junko Onishi Trio at the Montreux Jazz Festival (Toshiba EMI, 1997)[LD/VHS]
 John Lee Hooker & The Coast To Coast Blues Band: Live At Montreux 1983 & 1990 (Eagle Pop Entertainment, 2020)
 King Sunny Adé: Live at Montreux (1982)
 Korn: Live at Montreux 2004 (2004)
 Les McCann: Live at Montreux (Atlantic, 1973) – recorded in 1972
 Les McCann and Eddie Harris: Swiss Movement (Atlantic, 1969)
 Little Milton: What It Is: Live at Montreux (Atlantic, 1973)
 Louisiana Red: Live in Montreux (Earwig, 2000) – recorded in 1975
 Luther Allison: Live in Montreux 1976–1994 (Ruf, 1996) – compilation
 Marlena Shaw: Marlena Shaw Live at Montreux (Blue Note, 1974) – recorded in 1973
 McCoy Tyner: Enlightenment (Milestone, 1973)
 Michel Petrucciani: Power of Three (Blue Note, 1986)[LP/CD]
 Mike Oldfield: Live at Montreux 1981 (Eagle Vision, 2006)[DVD]
 Mike Mainieri & Warren Bernhardt: Free Smiles: Live At Montreux 1978 (Arista Novus, 1978)
 Miles Davis & Quincy Jones: Miles & Quincy Live at Montreux (Warner Bros., 1991)
 Modern Jazz Quartet: Together Again: Live at the Montreux Jazz Festival '82 (Pablo, 1982)
 Monty Alexander Trio: Monty Alexander Live! at the Montreux Jazz Festival (MPS, 1977) – recorded in 1976
 Ney Matogrosso & Caetano Veloso & Joao Bosco: "BRAZIL NIGHT - AO VIVO EM MONTREUX - CAETANO VELOSO, JOÃO BOSCO E NEY MATOGROSSO 1983“
 Nile Rodgers & Chic: Live at Montreux 2004 (Eagle Vision, 2005)[DVD]
 Ofra Haza: At Montreux Jazz Festival (Locust Music, 1998)[CD/DVD]
 Oliver Nelson: Swiss Suite (Flying Dutchman, 1970)
 Oscar Peterson: Oscar Peterson Jam – Montreux '77 (Pablo, 1977)
 Otis Rush: Live at Montreux 1986 (1986) – joint performance with Eric Clapton and Luther Allison
 Peter Tosh: Remedies For Babylon (Discurios, 1992) – recorded in 1979
 Pino Daniele: Sció live (EMI Italiana, 1984)[2LP] – 1 track recorded in 1983
 Rachelle Ferrell: Live in Montreux 91-97 (Blue Note, 2002) – compilation
 Randy Weston: Carnival (Freedom, 1974)
 Ray Bryant: Alone at Montreux (Atlantic, 1972)
 Ray Charles: Live at Montreux 1997 (Eagle, 2008)[Blu-ray]
 Run–D.M.C.: Live at Montreux 2001 (Eagle, 2007) – recorded in 2001
 Sadao Watanabe: At Montreux Jazz Festival (CBS/Sony, 1971) – recorded in 1970
 Sam Rivers: Streams (Impulse, 1973)
 Simply Red: Live at Montreux Jazz Festival – part of Stars Collectors Edition (1992)
 Steve Earle: Live at Montreux 2005 (Eagle, 2006)
 Stevie Ray Vaughan: Live at Montreux 1982 & 1985 (Epic, 2001)
 Stuff: Live at Montreux 1976 (Eagle, 2008) – recorded in 1976
 Sun Ra: Live at Montreux (Saturn Research, 1977)[2LP] – recorded in 1976
 Talk Talk: Live at Montreux 1986 (Eagle Vision, 2008) – recorded in 1986
 The Dubliners: Live at Montreux (Intercord, 1977) – recorded in 1976
 Titãs: Go Back (WEA, 1988)
 Tommy Flanagan: Montreux '77 (Pablo, 1977)
 Tori Amos: Live at Montreux 1991/1992 (Eagle, 2008) – recorded in 1991, 92
 Toto: Live at Montreux 1991 (Eagle, 2016)
 Van Morrison: Live at Montreux 1980/1974 (Eagle, 2006) – recorded in 1974, 80
 Yes: Live at Montreux 2003 (Eagle, 2007)
 Yōsuke Yamashita: Montreux Afterglow (Frasco, 1976)
 ZZ Top: Live at Montreux 2013 (Eagle Vision, 2014) – recorded in 2013
 Various Artists: Montreux Summit Volumes 1 & 2 (Columbia, 1977)[2LP] – consisting of an all-star concert with various Columbia label artists including Bob James, Stan Getz, Dexter Gordon, Billy Cobham, George Duke, Benny Golson, Eric Gale, Hubert Laws, Maynard Ferguson and many others
 Various Artists: Casino Lights (1981) – Featuring duets with Al Jarreau and Randy Crawford, Randy Crawford solo, Yellowjackets, and other artists
 Various Artists: Casino Lights (Warner Bros., 2000)[2CD] – recorded in 1999. consisting of an all-star concert with various Warner Bros. label artists

References

External links

 
 Montreux Jazz Concerts Database
 Claude Nobs Foundation
 Live at Montreux on YouTube
 Claude Nobs Revealed on CNN.com International

Jazz festivals in Switzerland
Montreux
Music festivals established in 1967
Recurring events established in 1967
Tourist attractions in the canton of Vaud
Summer events in Switzerland